Baavra Mann is a documentary film on the Indian filmmaker Sudhir Mishra directed by Jaideep Varma. Though ostensibly a biographical film, it is equally a portrait of the decline of the Indian creative and intellectual scene as touched by Sudhir Mishra's life, especially with regard to Sagar University, the theatre scene in Delhi and the film culture of Mumbai.

The film was begun and completed as a part-time film project through 2010 to 2013. The film's production house was called Saturday Films because the majority of the work used to happen on Saturdays.

In 2013 the film was taken over by Films Division, India, who is the official producer.

The film was completed in 2013 and travelled to festivals in New York Indian Film Festival and DC South Asian Festival – it won the "Best Documentary" award at the latter.

References

External links
Thew14.com

2013 films
2013 documentary films
Indian documentary films
Documentary films about film directors and producers
Documentary films about the cinema of India
2010s English-language films